Leucopogon fraseri is a species of flowering plant in the heath family Ericaceae and is native to south-eastern continental Australia and New Zealand, where it is known as Styphelia nesophila, pātōtara, or dwarf mingimingi. It is a prickly, prostrate to trailing or low-growing shrub with egg-shaped leaves, and erect, tube-shaped white flowers usually arranged singly in leaf axils.

Description 

Taxonomy
Leucopogon fraseri was first formally described in 1838 by Allan Cunningham in the journal, Annals of Natural History from a specimen found in 1820, "among ferns on the hills near the Bay of Islands" by Charles Fraser.

Distribution and habitat
It is found on the tablelands of northern and southern New South Wales, in eastern Victoria, on the Central Plateau of Tasmania, and in New Zealand.

Conservation status 
Leucopogon fraseri is listed as "not threatened" in New Zealand.

Ecology 
The fleshy fruits are dispersed by frugivory.

References 

fraseri
Plants described in 1838
Taxa named by Allan Cunningham (botanist)
Flora of New Zealand
Flora of New South Wales
Flora of the Australian Capital Territory
Flora of Victoria (Australia)
Flora of Tasmania